
Hannah Pittard is an American novelist and author of short stories.

Early life and education
Pittard was raised in Georgia. She attended Deerfield Academy in Massachusetts, where she received praise for her creative writing. She earned a bachelor's degree from the University of Chicago in 2001 and a Master of Fine Arts from the University of Virginia in 2007. She currently works at the University of Kentucky in Lexington KY.  Her literary influences include Southern authors Flannery O'Connor, William Faulkner, and Harry Crews.

Career
Pittard's first novel, The Fates Will Find Their Way, follows a group of boys from adolescence through middle age as they react to and speculate about a peer's mysterious disappearance. It was favorably reviewed by The New York Times Book Review and The Guardian. Pittard said that she had aimed to capture a "universal ... feeling and experience" of nostalgia.

Her second novel, Reunion, an editor's choice by the Chicago Tribune, examines the lives and relationships of adult siblings in the immediate aftermath of their father's unexpected suicide.

Listen to Me looks at personal and marital struggles of a wife and husband as they make a cross-country road trip.

Pittard's short stories have appeared in McSweeney's and Narrative Magazine.

Pittard's 2018 novel, Visible Empire, is loosely based on true events. It is the fictionalized aftermath of Air France Flight 007 accident, which exploded on the runway, killing all passengers. More than one hundred members of the Atlanta Art Association died.

Works
 The Fates Will Find Their Way (2011)
 Reunion (2014)
 Listen to Me (2016)
 Visible Empire (2018)

References

External links
 

21st-century American novelists
American women novelists
University of Chicago alumni
University of Virginia alumni
Deerfield Academy alumni
Novelists from Georgia (U.S. state)
Living people
21st-century American women writers
Year of birth missing (living people)